Pelayos was a Spanish paramilitary youth organization of the Carlist political party Traditionalist Communion during the Second Spanish Republic.

History 

Pelayos was founded by the Carlist movement of Spain during the early 1930s. The group was named after Pelagius of Córdoba (known as "Pelayo" in Spanish) who was killed as a martyr in 926AD. Members of Pelayos were given pre-military training and indoctrinated into the Carlist beliefs. During the Spanish Civil War, the magazine Pelayos (es) was created to spread Carlist values among Spanish youths.

Song of the Pelayos

References

External links 

Pelayos (in Spanish)
Bulletin of Pelayos of the Principality of Catalonia (in Spanish)

Carlism